The 2019–20 Adelaide Strikers Women's season was the fifth in the team's history. Coached by Luke Williams and captained by Suzie Bates, the Strikers finished second in the regular season of WBBL05 and qualified for finals. Propelled by Player of the Tournament Sophie Devine, they reached the championship decider against the Brisbane Heat at Allan Border Field but were defeated by six wickets to ultimately place as runners-up.

Squad 
Each 2019–20 squad featured 15 active players, with an allowance of up to five marquee signings including a maximum of three from overseas. Australian marquees are players who held a national women's team contract at the time of signing for their WBBL|05 team.

Notable details for the squad included:

 New Zealand marquee Sophie Devine returned for the Strikers to become one of only two overseas players, along with South African Marizanne Kapp (member of the Sydney Sixers), to play in each of the first five WBBL seasons with one team.
 Luke Williams was appointed as head coach, taking over from Andrea McCauley.
 Katie Mack joined the Strikers after spending four seasons with the Melbourne Stars.
 Overseas marquee Stafanie Taylor moved across from the Sydney Thunder but was unavailable for the middle portion of the season due to national team commitments with the West Indies.
 England marquee Lauren Winfield was signed as a replacement player—initially for 10 games but this tenure was extended due to a knee injury to Taylor. Winfield, however, would be unavailable for finals due to national team commitments, prompting calls from recently appointed CA Board member Mel Jones for greater cooperation between nations and better planning on scheduling.

The table below lists the Strikers players and their key stats (including runs scored, batting strike rate, wickets taken, economy rate, catches and stumpings) for the season.

Ladder

Fixtures 
All times are local time

Regular season

Knockout phase

Statistics and awards 

 Most runs: Sophie Devine – 769 (1st in the league)
 Highest score in an innings: Sophie Devine – 88 (56) vs Sydney Thunder, 24 November
 Most wickets: Sarah Coyte, Sophie Devine – 19 each (equal 4th in the league)
 Best bowling figures in an innings: Sarah Coyte – 3/9 (4 overs) vs Sydney Sixers, 30 November
 Most catches (fielder): Sophie Devine, Bridget Patterson – 10 each (equal 1st in the league)
 Player of the Match awards:
 Sophie Devine – 6
 Sarah Coyte – 2
 Suzie Bates, Tahlia McGrath, Bridget Patterson – 1 each
 Strikers Most Valuable Player: Sophie Devine
 WBBL|05 Player of the Tournament: Sophie Devine (winner)
 WBBL|05 Team of the Tournament: Sophie Devine, Megan Schutt

References 

2019–20 Women's Big Bash League season by team
Adelaide Strikers (WBBL)